Fein or FEIN may refer to:

People
 Adrian Fein (born 1999), German footballer
 Benjamin Fein (fl. 1910s), Jewish American gangster
 Bruce Fein (born 1947), American lawyer
 Clinton Fein (born 1964), South African artist, writer and activist
 Ellen Fein, co-author of the book The Rules
 Ephraim Fein, aka Ephraim Eitam (born 1952), Israeli brigadier general and politician
 Mónica Fein (born 1957), Argentine biochemist and politician
 Monroe Fein (1923–1982), US Navy officer and captain of the Altalena in a 1948 confrontation between the Israeli Defense Forces and the Irgun
 Robert Fein (1907–1975), Austrian Olympic champion weightlifter
 Rusty Fein (born 1982), American figure skater
 Sylvia Fein (born 1919), American painter and author
 Wilhelm Emil Fein (1842–898), German inventor

Other uses
 Fein and Sebé, characters in the anime Zatch Bell!
 Fein (company), founded by Wilhelm Fein
 Federal Employer Identification Number, used by the United States Internal Revenue Service

See also
 Fine (disambiguation)
 Fien, a list of people named Fien or van der Feen
  Friedberger Eigentümer-Identifikations-Nummer, a system to mark personal items

German-language surnames
Jewish surnames
Yiddish-language surnames